Lakeway may refer to:
 Lakeway (horse), an American Thoroughbred racehorse
 Lakeway, Texas, a city in Travis County, Texas, United States
 Mildred C. Lakeway School, an elementary school located in Littleton, New Hampshire, United States